The rougheye rockfish (Sebastes aleutianus) is a rockfish of the genus Sebastes. Similar to many other members of its genus, it is extremely long-lived, and has been known to reach an age of 205 years.

Taxonomy
The rougheye rockfish was first formally described as Sebastodes aleutianus in 1898 by the American ichthyologists David Starr Jordan and Barton Warren Evermann with the type locality given as off Karluk on Kodiak Island in the Shelikof Straits in Alaska. This taxon has been considered to be a synonymous with the blackspotted rockfish (S. melanostictus) but that taxon is now accepted as a valid species and both the blackspotted rockfish and the rougheye rockfish are classified within the subgenus Zalopyr. The specific name means of the Aleutian Islands, Kodiak Island used to be considered to be one of the Aleutians.

Description
The rougheye rockfish is so-named because of the ten or so spines found on the lower eyelid. It is pink, tan or brownish with irregular patches of brown of darker color and often a darker patch at the back of the operculum. The posterior part of the lateral line is often pink.

Distribution and habitat
Rougheye rockfish are deepwater fish, and exist between 31° and 66° latitude, in the North Pacific, and specifically along the coast of Japan to the Navarin Canyon in the Bering Sea, to the Aleutian Islands, all the way south to San Diego, California. These fish live near the seabed over boulders and rocks surrounded by soft substrates and in caves and crevices.

Behaviour
At some times of year the rougheye rockfish forms schools but during much of the year, larger fish are solitary or roam in small groups. It is among the most long-lived of fish species and individuals are believed to attain an age of over two hundred years. These fish feed on shrimps, crabs, fish, amphipods and mysids. This species is oviparous and breeds between the months of February and June or sometimes between October and January.

References

Sebastes
Taxa named by David Starr Jordan
Taxa named by Barton Warren Evermann
Fish described in 1898
Fish of the Pacific Ocean